Bulverism is a type of ad hominem rhetorical fallacy that combines circular reasoning and the genetic fallacy with presumption or condescension. The method of Bulverism is to "assume that your opponent is wrong, and explain his error." The Bulverist assumes a speaker's argument is invalid or false and then explains  the speaker came to make that mistake or to be so silly (even if the opponent's claim is actually right) by attacking the speaker or the speaker's motive.

The term Bulverism was humorously coined by C. S. Lewis after an imaginary character to poke fun at a very serious error in thinking that, he alleged, frequently occurred in a variety of religious, political, and philosophical debates.

Similar to Antony Flew's "subject/motive shift", Bulverism is a fallacy of irrelevance. One accuses an argument of being wrong on the basis of the arguer's identity or motive, but these are strictly speaking irrelevant to the argument's validity or truth.

Source of the concept
Lewis wrote about this in a 1941 essay, which was later expanded and published in 1944 in The Socratic Digest under the title "Bulverism".  This was reprinted both in Undeceptions and the more recent anthology God in the Dock in 1970.  He explains the origin of this term:

Threat and remedy
The special threat of this fallacy lies in that it applies equally to the person who errs as to that person's opponent. Taken to its logical consequence, it implies that all arguments are unreliable and hence undermines all rational thought. Lewis says, "Until Bulverism is crushed, reason can play no effective part in human affairs. Each side snatches it early as a weapon against the other; but between the two reason itself is discredited."

The remedy, according to Lewis, is to accept that some reasoning is not tainted by the reasoner. Some arguments are valid and some conclusions true, regardless of the identity and motives of the one who argues them.

See also 
 Appeal to motive
 Circular reasoning
 Genetic fallacy

Notes and references

Bibliography
 .

External links
 .
 .

Relevance fallacies
Deductive reasoning
C. S. Lewis